Dave and Steve's Video Game Explosion was a television video-game review show. In November 2001, it began airing on TBS (Turner Broadcasting System) as well as the Burly Bear TV network and later was part of a one-hour time slot.
Dave & Steve were listed on Entertainment Weekly's It List in 2002.

The comedy-based variety show was hosted by two accomplished comedy writers, David Mandel (Cat in the Hat, Eurotrip, Seinfeld and Saturday Night Live) and Steve Lookner (Seinfeld and Saturday Night Live). VGE was produced by Jack Helmuth and Shawn Valine. The main writers were Craig Digregorio (Da Ali G Show) and James Eagan.

Between game reviews the hosts often mocked their sponsor, SoBe, or abused their cheerleader Tiffany Holiday.

The show was produced by the Burly Bear Network (also known as Burly TV), a college television network headed by Lorne Michaels.

References

External links 
 
 Full Episodes on YouTube
 Tribute & Analysis of the series
 How Two Saturday Night Live Writers Made the Funniest Videogame Show You Never Saw

2000s American variety television series